Clarion Hotel The Hub is a hotel on Biskop Gunnerus' gate in Oslo, Norway.

History
Formerly known as the Hotel Viking, later as Hotel Royal Christiania, the building was the design work of architects Knut Knutsen and Fredrik Winsnes for which they were awarded the Houen Foundation Award in 1961. The hotel was financed and built by Oslo Municipality to accommodate the 1952 Winter Olympics.

At the time of its formal opening on December 10, 1951, it was the largest hotel in Scandinavia. Today, the hotel remains one of the largest in Norway,  with 810 rooms and 24 conference rooms, and is now owned by  Nordic Choice Hotels. The hotel has been expanded several times and reopened in March 2019.

References

External links
Official site

Hotels in Oslo
Hotels established in 1951
Hotel buildings completed in 1951
Hotel Royal Christiania
Hotel Royal Christiania